Sitka Spruce Park is a public park in the city of Unalaska, Alaska.  The roughly  park is located on Biorka Drive on Amaknak Island, south of Unalaska Airport.  It is one of the few places on the island where there are a significant number of trees.  A small part of the park is a National Historic Landmark, as it was the site of the earliest documented afforestation in North America.  In 1805, Russian agents planted an unknown number of Sitka spruce trees in the area, of which six were documented to be surviving in 1978.

History
Amaknak Island was naturally treeless, lying well outside the known growing range for trees in either Alaska or Siberia. The forestation attempt was ordered in 1805 by Nikolai Petrovich Rezanov, a principal in the Russian-American Company who had secured a monopoly on the fur trade in the area. It was reported ten years later that only a small number of trees were still alive.

The site was first documented by a professional botanist in 1899 when Bernhard Fernow visited Unalaska Island with the Harriman Alaska Expedition. The site has since then been the subject of periodic reports. Prior to World War II there ten trees standing, four of which were probably killed as a result of the United States Army's partial filling in of a nearby pond with gravel.

As of 1975, six of the originally planted trees still stood.  The site was declared a National Historic Landmark and listed on the National Register of Historic Places in 1978.

See also
List of National Historic Landmarks in Alaska
National Register of Historic Places listings in Aleutians West Census Area, Alaska

References

External links
City of Unalaska: Sitka Spruce Park

Parks in Alaska
Unalaska, Alaska
Geography of Aleutians West Census Area, Alaska
National Historic Landmarks in Alaska
1805 establishments in the Russian Empire
1805 establishments in the United States
National Register of Historic Places in Aleutians West Census Area, Alaska
Parks on the National Register of Historic Places in Alaska